Javier Amado Suárez Cueva (born 3 November 1943) is a retired Colombia road racing cyclist. He won the Vuelta a Colombia in 1965 and the Clásico RCN in 1965 and 1966. His nickname was El ñato.

He also competed in the team time trial at the 1964 Summer Olympics in Tokyo as part of the Colombian team.

Major results

1962
 3rd Overall Vuelta a Colombia
1st Stage 11
1963
 1st Stage 9 Vuelta a Colombia
1964
 1st Stage 6 Vuelta a Colombia
1965
 1st  Overall Vuelta a Colombia
1st Stages 7, 11, 14, 15 & 17
 1st  Overall Clásico RCN
1st Stage 1
1966
 1st  Overall Clásico RCN
1st Mountains classification
1st Stage 1
 Central American and Caribbean Games
1st  Team time trial
2nd  Road race
 2nd Overall Vuelta a Colombia
1st Stage 14
1967
 2nd Overall Vuelta a Colombia
1st Stage 19
1968
 1st Stage 3 Clásico RCN
 2nd Overall Vuelta a Colombia

References

External links

1943 births
Living people
Colombian male cyclists
Sportspeople from Antioquia Department
Olympic cyclists of Colombia
Cyclists at the 1964 Summer Olympics
20th-century Colombian people